Paul Jenkins may refer to:

Paul Jenkins (actor) (1938–2013), American actor
Paul Jenkins (barrister) (1954–2018), chief executive of the Treasury Solicitor's Department and Treasury Solicitor
Paul Jenkins (cricketer) (born 1972), English cricketer
Paul Jenkins (EastEnders), fictional character from EastEnders
Paul Jenkins (economist), Canadian economist and Senior Deputy Governor of the Bank of Canada
Paul Jenkins (painter) (1923–2012), American abstract expressionist painter
Paul Jenkins (poet), professor of poetry, Hampshire College
Paul Jenkins (politician) (born 1938), Australian politician
Paul Jenkins (writer) (born 1965), British comic book writer
Paul Jenkins, Welsh martial arts fighter, see list of mixed martial artists with the most sanctioned fights